Omari Elijah Giraud-Hutchinson (born 29 October 2003) is a 
professional footballer who plays as a winger or attacking midfielder for Premier League club Chelsea. Born in England, he represents the Jamaica national team.

Club career

Early career
Hutchinson began his career with Chelsea, joining in 2008, before being scouted and signed in 2012 by Charlton Athletic while playing football in the Addicks car park as his brother, Oshaye, was training with the youth team. While at Charlton, he caught the eye of North-London rivals Arsenal, having impressed in a game against them.

After two years with Charlton, Hutchinson left the club. Trials with Arsenal, Tottenham Hotspur and Brentford followed, but ultimately led to nothing. Hutchinson took a year-long break from academy football to play futsal with his friends, before joining Arsenal at under-12 level.

At the age of twelve, Hutchinson took part in a South-London tournament hosted by Brazilian football legend Pelé, who praised Hutchinson for his skills. At the tournament, he also met football content creators F2Freestylers, who invited him to star in a video on their YouTube channel. The video, showcasing Hutchinson's skills, has amassed over four million views.

In November 2020, Hutchinson signed his first professional contract with Arsenal. He was handed a place on the bench for the Arsenal senior team for the first time in their 1–0 FA Cup defeat to Nottingham Forest on 9 January 2022.

Return to Chelsea
On 16 July 2022, Hutchinson rejoined Chelsea for an undisclosed fee. and made his professional debut on 5 January 2023 in a 1–0 home defeat against Manchester City, coming on as a second half substitute.

International career
Born in England, Hutchinson is of Jamaican descent. He is a youth international for England, having represented the England U17s and U19s.

He was called up to the Jamaica national team in May 2022, and made his unofficial debut in a 6–0 loss to Catalonia in the same month. In November 2022, Hutchinson was told by Chelsea not to report for international duty with Jamaica, so that he could be involved in first team matches with The Blues.

He made his first official start for Jamaica in a 1–0 loss to Trinidad and Tobago on 11 March 2023.

Media
Hutchinson was involved in the Amazon Original sports docuseries All or Nothing: Arsenal, which documented the club by spending time with the coaching staff and players behind the scenes both on and off the field throughout their 2021–22 season.

Career statistics

Club

International

References

2003 births
Living people
People from Redhill, Surrey
Jamaican footballers
Jamaica international footballers
English footballers
England youth international footballers
English sportspeople of Jamaican descent
Association football midfielders
Chelsea F.C. players
Charlton Athletic F.C. players
Arsenal F.C. players
Black British sportspeople